There are at least 2 named lakes and reservoirs in Marion County, Arkansas.

Lakes
	Waltman Pond, el.

Reservoirs
	Bull Shoals Lake, el.

See also

 List of lakes in Arkansas

Notes

Bodies of water of Marion County, Arkansas
Marion